Karl Torsten Tikanvaara  until 1936 Wikman (21 June 1909 Jakobstad – 1993) was a Finnish diplomat and a lawyer. He was Finnish Permanent Representative  in the UN in Geneva from 1955 to 1959, Head of the Administrative Department of the Ministry for Foreign Affairs, 1959–1961, Commercial Representative in Cologne 1961–1964, and Ambassador to Canada in Ottawa, 1964–1967. and Caracas and Lima 1967–1976.

References 

1909 births
1993 deaths
People from Jakobstad
20th-century Finnish lawyers
Permanent Representatives of Finland to the United Nations
Ambassadors of Finland to Canada
Ambassadors of Finland to Venezuela
Ambassadors of Finland to Peru